Freda Slutzkin (died 1999) was the first woman lawyer in Mandatory Palestine.

Biography
Freda Slutzkin was born in Australia. She studied law in Palestine. In 1930, she became the first woman in Mandatory Palestine to take and pass the bar examination.

See also 
 Rosa Ginossar
 List of first women lawyers by nationality
Law in Israel

References 

Israeli women lawyers
Year of birth missing
1999 deaths
Australian emigrants to Israel